The United Arab Emirates women's national rugby sevens team represents the United Arab Emirates in rugby sevens. They won the West Asia women's 7s trophy in Doha.

References 

Women's national rugby sevens teams